Willie Abrams (1897–1987), also known as Ma Willie, was an American artist. She was a member of the Freedom Quilting Bee, along with her daughter Estelle Witherspoon, and is associated with the Gee's Bend quilters. Her work is included in the collection of the Metropolitan Museum of Art.

References 

Quilters
1897 births
1987 deaths
Artists from Alabama
20th-century American women artists
20th-century African-American women
20th-century African-American people
20th-century African-American artists